The Minot Industrial Historic District is a  historic district in Downtown Minot, North Dakota that was listed on the National Register of Historic Places in 1986.  It includes Classical Revival and Italianate architecture.  The listing included 31 contributing buildings and one other contributing structure.

It is bounded on the north by the Souris River.

References

Industrial buildings and structures on the National Register of Historic Places in North Dakota
Italianate architecture in North Dakota
Neoclassical architecture in North Dakota
Historic districts on the National Register of Historic Places in North Dakota
National Register of Historic Places in Ward County, North Dakota